The Sâi (also: Șiu) is a left tributary of the river Danube in Romania. It discharges into the Danube near Turnu Măgurele. It flows parallel to the lower course of the river Olt, about 5 km east of the Olt, through the villages Dăneasa, Sprâncenata, Beciu, Plopii-Slăvitești, Slobozia Mândra, Uda-Clocociov, Saelele, Lunca, Segarcea-Vale and Lița.

References

Rivers of Olt County
Rivers of Teleorman County
Rivers of Romania